The 2016 Taça 12 de Novembro is the 4th staging of the Taça 12 de Novembro.

Aitana will enter as the defending champions after winning the 2015 edition by defeating Dili Institute of Technology (DIT) 3-2 in the final.

Ponta Leste won the title this season after beating Assalam 1-0 in the final.

Schedule and format

Qualified teams
The following teams are qualified for the competition.

First round
This round match held between 4 and 19 August 2016. Benfica Dili received a bye.

|-

|}

Second round
This round match held between 20 and 27 August 2016. Cacusan received a bye.

|-

|}

Third round
This round match held between 28 August to 1 September 2016. DIT and SL Benfica receive a bye.

|-

|}

Semifinals
The semifinals held between 3 and 4 September 2016. 

|-

|}

Final
The final held on 10 September 2016 in Municipal Stadium. 

|-

|}

References

External links
Official website

Taça 12 de Novembro
Timor-Leste
Timor-Leste